The 1941 West Texas State Buffaloes football team was an American football team that represented West Texas State College (now known as West Texas A&M University) in the Border Conference during the 1941 college football season. In its second season under head coach Jack Curtice, the team compiled an 8–2 record (4–1 against conference opponents), finished in third place in the conference, and outscored all opponents by a total of 298 to 100. The 1941 season was the first for West Texas as a member of the Border Conference.  The team played its home games at Buffalo Stadium in Canyon, Texas.

The team averaged 29.8 points per game, ranking fourth among 119 major college programs for the 1941 season.  The team was led by halfback Ben Collins who was one of the nation's leading scorers. Collins and fullback Larry Sanders were selected by the conference coaches as first-team players on the 1941 All-Border Conference football team. Tackle Cletus Kuehler and guard Jold Farbus were named to the second team.

Schedule

References

West Texas State
West Texas A&M Buffaloes football seasons
West Texas State Buffaloes football